Upawansa Yapa PC was the 37th Solicitor General of Sri Lanka.

Early childhood
Upawansa Yapa was born on 2 November 1941 in Bandarawela, Sri Lanka.
 
Yapa received his education at Nalanda College Colombo and while at school, he led both Sinhala and English debating teams. He subsequently attended the University of Ceylon, Peradeniya in 1960, where he obtained Bachelor of Arts degree.

Career

In 1965 Yapa joined the Ceylon Law College and was admitted as an advocate of Your Lordship's Court in February, 1969. He joined the Attorney General's Department as a Crown Counsel in 1970 and served in the Department's Criminal Division. Later he rose to the position of Senior State Counsel, Deputy Solicitor General, Additional Solicitor General and finally as the Solicitor General.

He was appointed President's Counsel in September 1992. Yapa has appeared for the State in several important Criminal trials, including Sepala Ekanayake aircraft hijacking case.

References

 Daily News - Lakehouse Newspapers 
 Attorney General's Department Sri Lanka 
 Hulftsdorp Hill 17 January 1999 An honourable man was denigrated
 Kobbekaduwa Commission Crisis: Bar to defend Upawansa Yapa
 World: South Asia Sri Lanka torture goes unpunished
 Minister cites personal reasons for two members quitting commission probing HR abuses
 Tribute to seven distinguished members of Inner Bar
 How an honourable man was belittled
 මනම්පේරි ඝාතන කතාවේ සැඟවුනු රහස්‌ - 04 "කොණ්‌ඩෙ පීර පීර හිටිය දරුව පොලිසියෙන් පැනල අරන් ගියා"
 මානව හිමිකම් උල්ලංඝනය වීම් පිළිබඳ සොයාබැලීමට විශේෂ ජනාධිපති කොමිසමක්  [2006.11.07

Sinhalese lawyers
Sri Lankan Buddhists
President's Counsels (Sri Lanka)
Alumni of the University of Peradeniya
Alumni of Nalanda College, Colombo
Living people
1941 births
Solicitors General of Sri Lanka